Gods of Vermin is the first studio album by the German symphonic metal band Sons of Seasons, released in 2009. The album features as guests Epica's members Simone Simons and Mark Jansen and former member Luca Princiotta.

Track listing
All music by Oliver Palotai, except "Sanatorium Song" by Palotai and Henning Basse.
All vocal lines by Basse and Palotai, except where indicated

 "The Place Where I Hide" (instrumental) - 1:10 
 "Gods of Vermin" (Basse, Palotai, Tijs Vanneste) - 6:00
 "A Blind Man's Resolution" (Basse, Palotai, Vanneste) - 4:38
 "Fallen Family" (Basse, Palotai, Simons) - 5:11
 "The Piper" (Basse, Palotai, Vanneste) - 4:55
 "Wheel of Guilt" - 7:59
 "Belial's Tower" - 6:21
 "Fall of Byzanz" - 6:33
 "Wintersmith" (Basse, Palotai, Simons) - 5:24
 "Dead Man's Shadows" - 3:48
 "Sanatorium Song" (Basse, Palotai, Vanneste) - 5:43
 "Third Moon Rising" - 7:11
 "Melanchorium" (limited edition bonustrack) - 7:06

Personnel
Band members
 Henning Basse – lead vocals
 Oliver Palotai – keyboards, guitars, engineer
 Jürgen Steinmetz – bass
 Daniel Schild – drums, percussion

Additional musicians
Simone Simons - vocals on tracks 4 and 9, backing vocals on track 8 and cover art model
Mark Jansen - grunts on track 4
Tijs Vanneste - vocals 
Luca Princiotta - guitar solo on track 11
Christian Meike, Jan Peter - additional choir

Production
Alexander Krull - producer, engineer, mixing
Norman Meiritz - drum engineer

References

2009 debut albums
Napalm Records albums